Kotwica (Polish for "Anchor") is a Polish coat of arms. It was used by several szlachta (noble) families under the Polish–Lithuanian Commonwealth.

History
The Kotwica coat of arms was particularly popular among families of foreign origin indigenated in the Polish–Lithuanian Commonwealth.

Blazon
Gules, an Argent anchor, with three lopped branches on the dexter, all proper, debruised of a loop or anille in chief, also proper. Out of a crest coronet, three feathers.

Alternatively the shield is Argent and the anchor Black, Brunatre or Or.

Notable bearers
Notable bearers of this coat of arms have included:
 Hugo Kołłątaj, priest, politician, co-author of the Constitution of May 3, 1791;
 Andrzej Suski, Bishop of Toruń.

See also
 Polish heraldry
 Heraldry
 Coat of arms

Polish coats of arms